MYDA FC is an association football club from Malaba, near Tororo in the Eastern Region, Uganda.

The team won promotion to the Uganda Premier League for the 2020-21 Uganda Premier League season.

References 

Football clubs in Uganda